Curtomerus is a genus of beetles in the family Cerambycidae, containing the following species:

 Curtomerus brunneus (Kirsch, 1889)
 Curtomerus fasciatus (Fisher, 1932)
 Curtomerus flavus (Fabricius, 1775)
 Curtomerus glabrus (Fisher, 1932)
 Curtomerus lingafelteri Galileo & Martins, 2011
 Curtomerus piraiuba Martins & Galileo, 2006
 Curtomerus politus Martins, 1995
 Curtomerus puncticollis (Fisher, 1932)
 Curtomerus purus Martins, 1974

References

 
Callidiopini